Udea metasema is a moth of the family Crambidae. It is endemic to the Hawaiian islands of Maui and Hawaii.

The larvae feed on Phyllostegia glabra.

External links

Moths described in 1899
Endemic moths of Hawaii
metasema